Pentecost Cirque is a cirque between Hawkins Cirque and Dean Cirque on the south side of Olympus Range, McMurdo Dry Valleys. The cirque opens south to Wright Upper Glacier. Named by Advisory Committee on Antarctic Names (US-ACAN) (2004) after John S. Pentecost, PHI helicopter pilot with United States Antarctic Program (USAP) in seven consecutive field seasons from 1997 to 1998.

Cirques of Antarctica
Landforms of Victoria Land
McMurdo Dry Valleys